Turkmenlu may refer to:
 Apaga, Armenia - formerly Verin Turkmenlu
 Lusagyugh, Armavir, Armenia - formerly Nerkin Turkmenlu